North Thompson Islands Provincial Park is a provincial park in British Columbia, Canada.

External links

Provincial parks of British Columbia
Thompson Country
1996 establishments in British Columbia
Protected areas established in 1996